Zaitzevia parvula is a species of riffle beetle in the family Elmidae. It is found in North America.

Subspecies
These two subspecies belong to the species Zaitzevia parvula:
 Zaitzevia parvula parvula (Horn, 1870)
 Zaitzevia parvula thermae (Hatch, 1938)

References

Further reading

 
 
 

Elmidae
Articles created by Qbugbot
Beetles described in 1870